A supercollider is a high energy particle accelerator.

Supercollider may also refer to:

Science 
 The Superconducting Super Collider, planned 80 km particle collider project in Texas, cancelled in 1993
 The Tevatron, at Fermilab in Illinois, in operation from 1983 to 2011
 The Large Hadron Collider, at CERN, in operation from September 2008
 The High Luminosity Large Hadron Collider (formerly the Super Large Hadron Collider), a proposed upgrade to the Large Hadron Collider
 The Very Large Hadron Collider, a hypothetical future hadron collider with no target date
 Tera-Large Electron–Positron Collider, a hypothetical 80 km future electron-positron collider to be based at CERN as an alternative to a future linear collider

Music 
 Super_Collider (band), an electronic and soul-revivalist musical group formed in 1998
 "Supercollider" (song), a 2011 song by Radiohead
 Super Collider (album), a 2013 album by the band Megadeth, and the album's title track
 "Supercollider", a song by Fountains of Wayne from Welcome Interstate Managers
 "Supercollider", a 1993 single by Tribe
 Super Collider, 2010 musical piece by Christine Southworth written for the Kronos Quartet and Gamelan Elektrika
 SuperCollider, a software platform for audio synthesis and algorithmic music composition

Other media 
 Supercollider, a video game character in Freedom Force
 Supercollider, 2002 show by Keith Tyson at the South London Gallery
 "Supercollider", a series of 35mm digital animations by Marc Swadel and Paul Swadel
 Supercollider (film), a 2013 film directed by Jeffery Scott Lando  starring Enzo Cilenti

See also 
 Collider